In cryptography, Learning with errors (LWE) is a mathematical problem that is widely used in cryptography to create secure encryption algorithms. It is based on the idea of representing secret information as a set of equations with errors. In other words, LWE is a way to hide the value of a secret by introducing noise to it. In more technical terms, it refers to the computational problem of inferring a linear -ary function  over a finite ring from given samples  some of which may be erroneous. The LWE problem is conjectured to be hard to solve, and thus to be useful in cryptography.

More precisely, the LWE problem is defined as follows. Let  denote the ring of integers modulo  and let
Furthermore, the deviation from the equality is according to some known noise model. The problem calls for finding the function , or some close approximation thereof, with high probability.

The LWE problem was introduced by Oded Regev in 2005 (who won the 2018 Gödel Prize for this work), it is a generalization of the parity learning problem. Regev showed that the LWE problem is as hard to solve as several worst-case lattice problems. Subsequently, the LWE problem has been used as a hardness assumption to create public-key cryptosystems, such as the ring learning with errors key exchange by Peikert.

Definition 
Denote by  the additive group on reals modulo one. 
Let  be a fixed vector.
Denote by  the distribution on  obtained as follows.
 Pick a number  from the distribution ,
 Output the pair .

For every , denote by  the one-dimensional Gaussian with zero mean and variance
, that is, the density function is  where , and let  be the distribution on  obtained by considering  modulo one.  The version of LWE considered in most of the results would be

Decision version 

The LWE problem described above is the search version of the problem.

Solving decision assuming search 
Intuitively, if we have a procedure for the search problem, the decision version can be solved easily: just feed the input samples for the decision problem to the solver for the search problem. If the solver returns a candidate , for all , calculate . If the samples are from an LWE distribution, then the results of this calculation will be distributed according , but if the samples are uniformly random, these quantities will be distributed uniformly as well.

Solving search assuming decision 
For the other direction, given a solver for the decision problem, the search version can be solved as follows: Recover  one coordinate at a time. To obtain the first coordinate, make a guess , and do the following. Choose a number  uniformly at random. Transform the given samples  as follows. Calculate .  Send the transformed samples to the decision solver.

If the guess  was correct, the transformation takes the distribution  to itself, and otherwise, since  is prime, it takes it to the uniform distribution.

After obtaining , we follow an analogous procedure for each other coordinate .

Peikert showed that this reduction, with a small modification, works for any  that is a product of distinct, small (polynomial in ) primes.

Average case hardness 

Thus, no such  can exist, meaning LWE and DLWE are (up to a polynomial factor) as hard in the average case as they are in the worst case.

Hardness results

Regev's result 

This implies the hardness for LWE.

Peikert's result 

Use in cryptography 

The LWE problem serves as a versatile problem used in construction of several cryptosystems. In 2009, Peikert proved a similar result assuming only the classical hardness of the related problem . The disadvantage of Peikert's result is that it bases itself on a non-standard version of an easier (when compared to SIVP) problem GapSVP.

Public-key cryptosystem 
Regev proposed a public-key cryptosystem based on the hardness of the LWE problem. The cryptosystem as well as the proof of security and correctness are completely classical. The setting of the parameters used in proofs of correctness and security is
  for an arbitrary constant 

The cryptosystem is then defined by:
 Private key: Private key is an  chosen uniformly at random.
 Public key: Choose  vectors  uniformly and independently. The public key consists of 
 

The proof of correctness follows from choice of parameters and some probability analysis.

CCA-secure cryptosystem 

Peikert proposed a system that is secure even against any chosen-ciphertext attack.

Key exchange 

The idea of using LWE and Ring LWE for key exchange was proposed and filed at the University of Cincinnati in 2011 by Jintai Ding. The idea comes from the associativity of matrix multiplications, and the errors are used to provide the security. The paper appeared in 2012 after a provisional patent application was filed in 2012.

The security of the protocol is proven based on the hardness of solving the LWE problem. In 2014, Peikert presented a key-transport scheme following the same basic idea of Ding's, where the new idea of sending an additional 1-bit signal for rounding in Ding's construction is also used. The "new hope" implementation selected for Google's post-quantum experiment, uses Peikert's scheme with variation in the error distribution.

See also 
Post-quantum cryptography
Lattice-based cryptography
Ring learning with errors key exchange
Short integer solution (SIS) problem

References

Machine learning
Post-quantum cryptography